R18, or R-18, may refer to:

Media content ratings 
 R18 (British Board of Film Classification)
 R18+ issued by the Australian Classification Board
 R18 issued by the New Zealand Classification Office
 R18+ issued by Eirin in Japan
 R-18 issued by the Philippine Movie and Television Review and Classification Board

Other uses 
 R18 (drone), a Ukrainian unmanned combat aerial vehicle
 Audi R18, a Le Mans prototype racing car
 BMW R18, a cruiser motorcycle made by BMW during the COVID-19 pandemic
 R18: In use, may form flammable/explosive vapour-air mixture, a risk phrase
 R18.com, a Japanese English-language adult website created by Hokuto Corporation
 R-18 regional road (Montenegro)
 Renault 18, a French automobile
 Rubik R-18 Kánya, a Hungarian light aircraft
 , a submarine of the United States Navy

See also 
 18 rating